Ali Riza Kolonja (1880–1930) was an Albanian army general, diplomat and politician who served as Minister of War in the Delvina Government.

Biography
Ali Riza Kolonja was born on 1880 in the region of Kolonjë, present day south-eastern Albania, then part of the Ottoman Empire. He graduated from the military gymnasium of Manastir and then attended two military academies in Istanbul. Later he enrolled at the Staff College in Berlin and subsequently became an officer in the Turkish Army where he would rise to the rank of general.
In the fall of 1912, he served as division commander in the Balkan Wars that Turkey had waged in the Balkans against the Serbs to the north and the Greeks to the south.

At the conclusion of the wars, Kolonja responded to an invitation by Ismail Qemali to join a group of soldiers and army officers of Albanian origin that were led by Mehmet Pashë Deralla. He played a significant role in the organization of the new Albanian Army that was established by the provisional government. 

A few years later, as a senior military officer, he gained distinction within the ranks of the Albanian units that were included in the Armée d'Orient led by general Henri Descoigns, during the existence of the Autonomous Province of Korçë (1916–1918). In 1920, he was appointed Minister of War in the Delvina Cabinet which formed after the Congress of Lushnjë and concurrently held the title Chief of the General Staff until December 1921. Throughout this period, he carried out large military operations to suppress the Mirdita Uprising and along with Italian general Enrico Tellini, represented the Albanian side in talks with the Border Commission from 1922–1923.

From 1922 until 1924, he served as Albanian minister to Belgrade and as non-resident minister to Prague (1924). He died in 1930.

Recognition
On December 2009, the President of the Republic, Bamir Topi, awarded general Ali Riza Kolonja the medal "For Outstanding Services", with the motivation: "For outstanding merits in the re-establishment of the Albanian Armed Forces and for the protection of state borders". A street in Tirana bears his name.

References

Government ministers of Albania
Defence ministers of Albania
People from Kolonjë
Albanian generals
Albanian politicians
1880 births
1930 deaths
Albanians from the Ottoman Empire